Jhon Jairo Valencia Ortíz (born 27 March 1982), is a Colombian football midfielder. He currently plays for Alianza Atlético in the Primera División Peruana.

External links
 
https://web.archive.org/web/20120219201842/http://www.america.com.co/publicaciones.php?id=20638

1982 births
Living people
Footballers from Medellín
Colombian footballers
Colombia international footballers
Deportes Quindío footballers
Deportivo Pereira footballers
América de Cali footballers
Once Caldas footballers
Atlético Nacional footballers
Juan Aurich footballers
Independiente Santa Fe footballers
La Equidad footballers
Alianza Atlético footballers
Categoría Primera A players
Peruvian Primera División players
Colombian expatriate footballers
Expatriate footballers in Peru
Colombian expatriate sportspeople in Peru
Association football midfielders